The Secretary-General of the European Commission is the senior civil servant of the European Commission. The Secretary-General, who is responsible to the President of the European Commission, is in charge of the various Directorates-General, headed by Directors-General.

Their staff form the Secretariat-General of the European Commission.

List of Secretaries-General of the European Commission

Émile Noël, France, 1957–1987
David Williamson, United Kingdom, 1987–1997
, The Netherlands, 1997–2000
David O'Sullivan, Ireland, 2000–2005
Catherine Day, Ireland 2005–2015
Alexander Italianer, Netherlands, 2015–2018
Martin Selmayr, Germany, 2018–2019
Ilze Juhansone, Latvia, 2019–present

See also
 European Civil Service

References

 
Civil Service of the European Union